{{Taxobox
| name              = Sigara fossarum
| image             = Sigara fossarum 01.JPG
| regnum            = Animalia
| phylum            = Arthropoda
| classis           = Insecta
| ordo              = Hemiptera
| subordo           = Heteroptera
| infraordo         = Nepomorpha
| familia           = Corixidae
| genus             = Sigara
| species           = S. fossarum| binomial          = Sigara fossarum| binomial_authority = (Leach, 1817)
}}Sigara fossarum''' is a species of water boatman in the family Corixidae in the order Hemiptera.

References

Insects described in 1817
Sigara